The 2015 ISL domestic draft was  the second  domestic draft from the Indian Super League, the franchise domestic football league in India. The draft featured 114 players, of which only  40 were picked. The draft took place in Mumbai on 10 July 2015.

Players available for the draft

Player selection

Round 1

Round 1 trades

Round 2

Round 2 trades

Round 3

Round 3 trades

Round 4

Round 4 trades
None

Round 5

Round 5 trades

Round 6

Round 6 trades

Round 7

Round 7 trades
None

References

2015 Indian Super League season
Indian Super League drafts
Draft
Association football player non-biographical articles
ISL Inaugural Domestic Draft
ISL Inaugural Domestic Draft
2010s in Mumbai
Football in Mumbai
Events in Mumbai